Kung Fu: The Legend Continues is an action/crime drama series and sequel to the original 1972–1975 television series Kung Fu. While the original Kung Fu series was set in the American old west, Kung Fu: The Legend Continues was set in modern times. It starred David Carradine and Chris Potter as a father and son trained in kung fu – Carradine playing a Shaolin monk, Potter a police detective. The series aired in syndication for four seasons from January 27, 1993, to January 1, 1997, and was broadcast in over 70 countries. Filming took place in Toronto, Ontario. Reruns of the show have been aired on TNT.

The show was canceled when its producer, Prime Time Entertainment Network (also known as PTEN), ceased operations and no other producer opted to continue the series.

Plot
Like his grandfather and namesake from the original series, Kwai Chang Caine (David Carradine) is a Shaolin priest who walked out of the past. Caine was the head of a temple in Northern California, where his son Peter (Chris Potter) also lived and studied, until the temple was destroyed in a fire caused by a renegade priest who believed the priests should serve as mercenaries. After the destruction of the temple, each believed the other had perished and went on their separate ways; Caine wandered and traveled, much as his grandfather had, while Peter became a foster child and eventually a police officer. The series begins when Caine comes to fictional Sloanville and ends up in the Chinatown section of town, where Peter's precinct is located, and they are reunited after 15 years.

Main cast
David Carradine as Kwai Chang Caine, Matthew Caine
Chris Potter as Det. Peter Caine
Kim Chan as Lo Si (The Ancient) / Ping Hai
Robert Lansing as Capt. Paul Blaisdell (Season 1 and 2)
Kate Trotter as Capt. Karen Simms (Season 3 and 4)
Scott Wentworth as Det. Kermit Griffin (Season 2–4)
Nathaniel Moreau as Young Peter Caine (in flashbacks, Season 1–3)
Robert Bednarski as Younger Peter Caine (in flashbacks, Season 4)
Belinda Metz as Det. Jody Powell, Det. Kira Blakemore
Richard Anderson as Narrator (uncredited)
Rob Moses as Master Khan
Sandey Grinn as Thomas Jefferson "T.J." Kincaid (Season 3 and 4)
William Dunlop as  Chief of Detectives Frank Strenlich

Production
In 1992, the series was sold to television stations as a first-run syndicated series, alongside Time Trax. The series was originally sold as Kung Fu: The Next Generation.

Episodes

Home media
On May 27, 2014, Warner Bros. released the complete first season on DVD in Region 1 in the USA only not Canada, via their Warner Archive Collection.  Season 2 was released on August 18, 2015.

The first season was released in Germany on DVD in 2009.

International broadcasters
 – Sirasa TV
 – RPN Channel 9
 – First-run syndication, ATV/CTV/ASN/NTV
 – PTEN, first-run syndication
 – KTN
 – RTL Klub
 – RCTI
 – Polsat, TVN, TVN 7
 – ČT1
 – PRO 7, Kabel 1
 – Televisa
 – SBT

References

External links
 
 Kung Fu: The Legend Continues online FAQ
 Kung Fu: The Legend Continues at Episodate.com

1993 American television series debuts
1997 American television series endings
1993 Canadian television series debuts
1997 Canadian television series endings
First-run syndicated television programs in the United States
Prime Time Entertainment Network
First-run syndicated television shows in Canada
Television series by Warner Bros. Television Studios
Legend Continues
Television shows filmed in Toronto
English-language television shows
Sequel television series
Alternative sequel television series
1990s American crime drama television series
1990s Canadian crime drama television series
American action adventure television series
Canadian action adventure television series